P67 may refer to:

 BRM P67, an experimental Formula One car
 Intel P67, a computer chipset
 , also HMS Vox (P67), a submarine in service with the Free French Naval Forces and the Royal Navy
 Magdalen papyrus, a biblical manuscript
 McDonnell XP-67, an American prototype interceptor aircraft
 P67, a state regional road in Latvia